The Sanders County Jail is a historic jail built in 1907 in Thompson Falls in Sanders County, Montana.  It was listed on the National Register of Historic Places in 1986.

It was built by contractors Christian & Gobelet for $5,000 and is a two-story brick building on a stone and mortar foundation.  It has a shallow hipped roof.  It has jail cells installed by the Paully Jail Company of St. Louis.

In 1984 it was the oldest surviving county building, and it was rented out to the Thompson Falls Historical Society.

References

National Register of Historic Places in Sanders County, Montana
Buildings and structures completed in 1907
1907 establishments in Montana
Jails on the National Register of Historic Places in Montana
Thompson Falls, Montana